Baker Mountain may refer to:

 Baker Mountain (Piscataquis County, Maine), US
 Baker Mountain (West Virginia), US
 Baker Mountain (ski area), in Moscow, Maine, US

See also
 List of mountains named Baker Mountain
 Baker (disambiguation)
Baker Peak (disambiguation)
 Mount Baker (disambiguation)